The Men's U23 African Volleyball Championship is a sport competition for national teams with players under 23 years, held biannually and organized by the African Volleyball Confederation.

History
The first championship is currently being held in Sharm El-Sheikh, Egypt, from November 7 to 12, 2014.

Results

Performance by nation

Participating nations

See also
Women's U23 African Volleyball Championship

References

U23
U23